Walid Cherfa (born 19 February 1986) is an Algerian professional footballer who plays as a left-back for French club Toulouse Rodéo.

Career
Cherfa was born in Toulouse, France. A Toulouse FC youth graduate, he appeared sparingly for the first team during the 2006–07 season in Ligue 1, subsequently serving a stint with third division club Tours FC.

On 26 June 2008, Cherfa moved to Spain and joined Gimnàstic de Tarragona in the second level on a two-year contract. On 23 June 2010, having been sparingly used during his tenure, he signed a 1+1 deal with another side in that country and category, Girona FC.

In late December 2010, without having appeared in any competitive matches for Girona, Cherfa terminated his link with the Catalans and signed for Albacete Balompié, also in the Spanish division two. On 16 August of the following year, he agreed to a two-year deal with Algerian Ligue Professionnelle 1 side MC Alger.

On 1 January 2012, Cherfa was released by the club. In August 2012 he joined Kalloni F.C. in the Greek second tier, and subsequently competed in the French lower or amateur leagues.

Personal life
Cherfa's older brother, Sofyane, was also a footballer and a defender. He too played most of his career in France.

References

External links

1986 births
Living people
French sportspeople of Algerian descent
Footballers from Toulouse
Algerian footballers
French footballers
Association football defenders
Ligue 1 players
Championnat National players
Championnat National 3 players
Toulouse FC players
Tours FC players
Toulouse Rodéo FC players
Segunda División players
Gimnàstic de Tarragona footballers
Girona FC players
Balma SC players
Toulouse Fontaines Club players
Albacete Balompié players
Algerian Ligue Professionnelle 1 players
MC Alger players
Football League (Greece) players
AEL Kalloni F.C. players
Algerian expatriate footballers
Expatriate footballers in Spain
Expatriate footballers in Greece
Algerian expatriate sportspeople in Spain
Algerian expatriate sportspeople in Greece